Chmielewski (feminine: Chmielewska, plural: Chmielewscy) is a Polish surname meaning "one from the place of the hops". In other Slavic languages it may be transliterated as Khmelevsky, Khmelevskiy or Hmelevsky (masculine). The feminine form is Khmelevska or Hmelevska in Ukrainian and Khmelevskaya or Hmelevskaya in Russian. Notable people with the surname include:

Aron Chmielewski (born 1991), Polish ice hockey player
Bill Chmielewski (born 1941), American basketball player
Florian Chmielewski (born 1927), American politician
Henryk Chmielewski (boxer) (1914–1998), Polish boxer
Henryk Chmielewski (comics) (born 1923), Polish comic book author
Joanna Chmielewska (1932–2013), Polish writer
Karl Chmielewski (1903–1991), German Nazi SS concentration camp commandant
Marina Khmelevskaya (born 1990), Uzbekistani long-distance runner
Piotr Chmielewski (born 1970), Polish cyclist
Stanisław Chmielewski (born 1958), Polish politician
Vasiliy Khmelevskiy (1948–2002), Soviet hammer thrower
Wiesław Chmielewski (born 1957), Polish modern pentathlete
Wojciech Chmielewski (born 1995), Polish luger
Zdzisław Chmielewski (born 1942), Polish historian
Zygmunt Chmielewski (1894–1978), Polish actor

See also 
Chmielowski, Polish surname

References

Polish-language surnames